The 2010–11 FA Vase Final was the 37th final of the Football Association's cup competition for teams at levels 9-11 of the English football league system. The match was contested between Coalville Town, of the Midland Alliance (level 9), and Whitley Bay , of the Northern League Division 1 (level 9).

Match

YouTube highights

Details

References

FA Vase Finals
FA Vase Final
FA Vase Final
Events at Wembley Stadium
FA Vase Final 2011